Alexandria... Why? (translit. Iskanderija... lih?) is a 1979 Egyptian drama film directed by Youssef Chahine. It was entered into the 29th Berlin International Film Festival, where it won the Silver Bear - Special Jury Prize. The film was selected as the Egyptian entry for the Best Foreign Language Film at the 52nd Academy Awards, but was not accepted as a nominee.

Plot
The film portrays the early life of the director in his home city, Alexandria.

Cast
 Naglaa Fathi as Sarah 
 Farid Shawqi as Mohsen's Father Shaker Pasha
 Mahmoud El-Meliguy as Qadry
 Ezzat El Alaili as Morsi 
 Youssef Wahbi
 Yehia Chahine
 Laila Fawzi
 Aeela Rateb
 Ahmed Zaki as Ibrahim
 Gerry Sundquist as Thomas 'Tommy' Friskin

See also
 Top 100 Egyptian films
 List of submissions to the 52nd Academy Awards for Best Foreign Language Film
 List of Egyptian submissions for the Academy Award for Best Foreign Language Film

References

External links

1979 films
1979 drama films
1979 LGBT-related films
1970s coming-of-age films
1970s Arabic-language films
Egyptian drama films
Egyptian LGBT-related films
LGBT-related drama films
Films directed by Youssef Chahine
Silver Bear Grand Jury Prize winners
Films set in Alexandria